Acioa is a genus of plants in the family Chrysobalanaceae described as a genus in 1775. It is native to northeastern South America.

Species
 Acioa barteri - 
 Acioa edulis - Amazonas in Brazil
 Acioa guyanensis - French Guiana, N Brazil
 Acioa schultesii - SE Colombia, S Venezuela, NW Brazil
 Acioa somnolens - French Guiana, N Brazil

References

Chrysobalanaceae genera
Chrysobalanaceae
Flora of South America
Taxonomy articles created by Polbot
Taxa named by Jean Baptiste Christian Fusée-Aublet